Raphael of Brooklyn, born Rufāʾīl Hawāwīnī (Raphael Hawaweeny; ; November 20, 1860 – February 27, 1915), was bishop of the Russian Orthodox Church, auxiliary bishop of Brooklyn, vicar of the Northern-American diocese, and head of the Antiochian Levantine Christian mission. He was the first Orthodox Christian bishop consecrated on American soil.

Life 
He was born in modern-day Lebanon to Damascene Syrian (Antiochian Greek Christian) parents of the Antiochian Orthodox faith who had come to Beirut fleeing the 1860 Syrian Civil War in Damascus. He was first educated at the Damascus Patriarchal School that had become the leading Greek Orthodox institution of higher learning in the Levant under the leadership of Joseph of Damascus. He furthered his study of Christian theology at the Patriarchal Halki seminary in Constantinople, and at the Theological Academy in Kiev, Russian Empire (now Kyiv, Ukraine).
 
Father Raphael was sent to New York City in 1895 by Tsar Nicholas II of Russia to administer the local Orthodox Christian community which then included mainly Russian, Greek, and Levantine immigrants.

In 1904, he became the first Orthodox bishop to be consecrated in North America; the consecration was performed in New York City by Archbishop Tikhon (Bellavin) and Bishop Innocent (Pustynsky). He served as Bishop of Brooklyn until his death.

During the course of his ministry as an auxiliary bishop of the Russian Orthodox Church in America, Raphael founded the present-day St. Nicholas Antiochian Orthodox Cathedral (Brooklyn), established thirty parishes and assisted in the founding of St. Tikhon's Orthodox Monastery.

Bishop Raphael founded the official magazine of the Antiochian Orthodox Archdiocese, The Word, in 1905 in Arabic (الكلمة).

Glorification and honors 
Bishop Raphael was originally buried in New York until August 1988, when his relics were translated to the Antiochian Village Camp in Ligonier, Pennsylvania, on property of the Antiochian Archdiocese, along with several other bishops and clergy.

Raphael was glorified by the Holy Synod of the Orthodox Church in America (OCA) in its March 2000 session. He is commemorated by the OCA on February 27, the anniversary of his death and by the Antiochian Orthodox Church on the first Saturday of November near the Synaxis of the Archangels Michael, Gabriel, Raphael and all the bodiless powers of heaven.

In 2015, the Antiochian Archdiocese, OCA and ROCOR celebrated the 100th Anniversary of the dormition of St. Raphael.

He is commemorated on 14 February and on 27 October - Synaxis of All Saints of Kiev Theological Academy and Kiev Theological Seminary in Ukrainian Orthodox Church.

See also

 St. Nicholas Antiochian Orthodox Cathedral (Brooklyn)
 Saint Nicholas Russian Orthodox Cathedral, New York

References

 “Christian Church to be Filled by a Damascus Preacher” (The New York Times, Sept 15, 1895)

External links
Raphael of Brooklyn, from OrthodoxWiki
Bishop Raphael’s New Attitude (1912)

1860 births
1915 deaths
20th-century Christian saints
20th-century Eastern Orthodox bishops
American saints of the Eastern Orthodox Church
American people of Syrian descent
Emigrants from the Russian Empire to the United States
Members of the Greek Orthodox Church of Antioch
Greek Orthodox Christians from Lebanon
Religious leaders from Beirut
Russian saints of the Eastern Orthodox Church
Syrian Christian saints
Theological School of Halki alumni
Emigrants from the Ottoman Empire to the Russian Empire
Syrian expatriates in Lebanon